Protomegabaria is a genus of flowering plant belonging to the  family Phyllanthaceae first described as a genus in 1911. It is native to western and central Africa. It is dioecious, with male and female flowers on separate plants.

Species
 Protomegabaria macrophylla (Pax) Hutch. - Nigeria, Cameroon, Republic of the Congo, Gabon, Gulf of Guinea Islands
 Protomegabaria meiocarpa J.Léonard - Gabon, Democratic Republic of the Congo
 Protomegabaria stapfiana (Beille) Hutch. - West Africa (Liberia to Republic of the Congo)

References

Phyllanthaceae
Flora of Africa
Phyllanthaceae genera
Dioecious plants